Candorville is a syndicated newspaper comic strip written and illustrated by Darrin Bell. Launched in September 2003 by The Washington Post Writers Group, Candorville features young black and Latino characters living in the inner city. Using the vehicle of humor, Candorville presents social and political commentary as well as the stories of its protagonists.

Publication history
Candorville grew out of a comic strip called Lemont Brown, which appeared in the student newspaper of UC Berkeley, The Daily Californian, from 1993 to 2003. It still appears in the Daily Californian under its new title, and it is that newspaper's longest-running comic strip. Candorville appears in most of America's largest newspapers. It also runs in Spanish-language newspapers where it is translated by the author's wife, Laura Bustamante.

Candorville and Bell's other strip, Rudy Park, exist in a shared universe. For a period in 2017, the strips were amalgamated while Bell was dealing with health and exhaustion issues. In June 2018, Bell ended Rudy Park, although characters from that strip will continue to appear in Candorville. (Candorville is syndicated in many more newspapers than was Rudy Park.)

Because of its political content, Candorville, like Doonesbury, sometimes appears on a newspaper's editorial page rather than its comics page; like G.B. Trudeau's strip, Candorville has been accused of having a liberal slant, which has prevented the strip from being syndicated to some right-leaning newspapers. This is despite the fact that Candorville has lampooned liberal organizations like PETA, and liberal politicians like Hillary Clinton, Howard Dean, John Edwards, and Barack Obama.

In late 2022 syndication of Candorville moved to King Features Syndicate as the Washington Post Writers Group wound down its comics line.

Characters and story

Main characters 
Lemont Brown is the strip's main character. A talented young black writer, Lemont began regularly submitting articles to The New Yorker, and was regularly rejected in humiliating fashion. During this period Lemont worked for minimum wage at Pigville Pork Burgers.  Constant prodding from his best friend Susan led him to create his own blog, which eventually led to his employment by a newspaper.  Lemont is thoughtful, responsible, and clever, and he cares about both the world and his small circle of friends, whom he has known all his life. He is the consummate nerd, cannot dance, and is obsessed with science fiction. He is often seen self-referentially reading the book Thank God for Culture Clash, which is a collection of Candorville cartoons.

He got engaged to Roxanne, an ignorant and deranged woman who had his love child.  Based on actions in the strip, he did not appear to love this woman, but proposed to her anyway, apparently to stay close to his child. Eventually they broke up, with Lemont gaining custody of his son. This is a conflict with his (slowly and subconsciously) developing romantic feelings for and relationship with Susan Garcia (see below). He once wrote about the love of "Leroy" and "Susana" on his blog. Roxanne, as it turns out, might be an evil vampire.  Meanwhile, his newspaper, the Candorville Chronicle, fired all of its reporters except for Lemont, so Lemont is working as the paper's Senior White House Correspondent.

Susan Garcia is Lemont's best friend. An upwardly-mobile Latina who works as a top executive at an advertising agency, Susan is ambitious, straightforward, and maybe a little too wrapped up in herself. She is constantly frustrated that Lemont does not seem to know how to make his dream a reality, as she did. She has a sister who changed her name from Esperanza to Hope (A possible reference to The House on Mango Street) in order to appear to be Anglo instead of Mexican. Susan has known Lemont all her life and they have been platonic friends, but they seem to have deeper romantic feelings for one another that neither one will acknowledge. However, as recently as the June 5, 2008, comic, Susan accidentally revealed to Lemont she loved him while offering to pay off his credit card debt. When Lemont frustrates her, she occasionally lapses into Spanish, like Ricky Ricardo. Susan's nemesis is her assistant at work, Dick Fink, who seems to sabotage her and obviously wants her job. Her clueless and ethically challenged boss is Mr. Fitzhugh (possibly an homage to the philosopher George Fitzhugh who argued in favor of slavery as the natural and necessary state of black people). Mr. Fitzhugh often makes small changes to Susan's advertising campaigns to make them more dishonest. He once wore a T-shirt to work that said: "We invaded Iraq and all I got was this lousy $25 million contract."
Clyde Dogg (also known as C-Dog) is Lemont's foil. Like Lemont, Clyde grew up in a broken home. Unlike Lemont, Clyde is irresponsible and lazy, and he blames everyone else for his own shortcomings. He seems to purposely validate every stereotype about black men, for which Lemont regularly scolds him. He seems stupid at times, but other times it seems as though his "stupidity" is an act he puts on just to thumb his nose to the world. Clyde dresses and acts like a thug, and very well might be one. But the only time he has been seen stealing so far, it has been from Lemont. He gets caught, but perhaps it's because he wants to get caught. He often calls Lemont "Big L", probably a reference to the rapper of the same name since Big L's first name was also Lamont. He castigates Lemont for "acting white" whenever Lemont reads a book or crosses the street at a crosswalk, and he jealously guards his thuggish street reputation. He once crossed the street at a crosswalk, for which his other friends called him a sellout. To get back in their good graces, C-Dog put a recliner in the middle of a busy street and went to sleep on it during rush hour, for which he was sent to jail. C-Dog is an aspiring rapper, and is unemployed. He has an illegitimate business selling fake Botox injections out of his trench coat in a dark alley. Curiously, months after C-Dog began that business, several real-life incidents occurred where women died after receiving fake Botox injections. Clyde has also periodically showed moments of surprising political insight, such as when he talked about how Mr Church embodied the "Magical Negro" stereotype , and when he commented about racist policing .

Supporting characters
Reverend Wilfred is a formerly liberal Democratic reverend in the mold of Al Sharpton, but after receiving almost $1 million from the White House Office of Faith-Based and Community Initiatives, the good Reverend suddenly did a 180 and became an ultra-conservative Bush supporter who uses his pulpit to preach against the evils of liberalism.  He has recently begun to be slightly more skeptical of his turn-around, but has yet to recant his new ideals. It is revealed that he has used the entirety of his pay-off to better his community. He may be somewhat based on Jesse Lee Peterson.
Dick Fink is Susan's backstabbing assistant who is very obviously out to undermine her.
Roxanne is Lemont's white fiancée. A vegan, Lemont brought her to a steak restaurant for their first date and it went downhill from there, but somehow Roxanne ended up pregnant with Lemont's child. Lemont, whose father walked out on his mother when he was a child, is desperate to make sure his child avoids his fate, and agrees to marry her. Unfortunately, it is nearly impossible to think of two people less suited for each other. While Lemont is easy-going and free-thinking, Roxanne is belligerent and bitter. She is insanely jealous of Susan and Lemont's friendship (sensing Lemont's subconscious love for Susan), and has attempted to break up the friendship between the two, but without success. Their child has been born and first appeared in a comic in October 2007.
Saxon Kenchu is a childhood friend of Roxanne's who claims that she's actually a vampire, and he is a Dhampir the half-vampire offspring of her and a vampire hunter named Artemis Kenchu. It's unclear whether this is true or whether this is an elaborate ruse he's using to break up Roxanne and Lemont (since he knows Lemont's heavily into sci fi and fantasy, he might be manipulating him).
Bus Stop Guy is a neocon who goes through great logical contortions to rationalize current events, such as the push against stem-cell research, the Iraq War, driving an SUV, the campaign against gay marriage, and many other issues.
Homeless Dudes Tyrone and Rosencrantz often appear living in alleys, cardboard boxes and on the sidewalks. They engage in absurdist dialogue and commentary. The two homeless characters may be an homage to the titular characters of the play Rosencrantz and Guildenstern Are Dead.
Past and Future Lemont Lemont is occasionally visited in his dreams by both past and future versions of himself. One version, who visits him from the past, is six or seven years old. The other version is 70–80 years old and speaks very cryptically. Once, before interviewing a Hurricane Katrina victim, Lemont was visited by himself from one week later, warning him to do something that he ended up not doing. A few times, the strip has been set in 1982 and past Lemont is the main character, who receives visits from present Lemont warning him to stay away from girls, and telling him to buy only certain comic books which will appreciate in value by the present day.
Mainstream Media Guy (also known as MSM guy) is a big, grinning, football jersey-wearing embodiment of the oblivious mainstream mass media. He first appeared in August 2006. Lemont runs into the MSM guy at the bus stop every once in a while, and the MSM guy shouts trivial news items to him, while ignoring or downplaying important events. He is related to The Internet, who is mostly the same except for not wearing any clothes save for a tin foil hat, and being slightly more erratic (believing that shaking hands can transmit Alzheimer's disease, among other things).
Al Qaeda's #2 Man is a walking, dismembered corpse who keeps getting blown up, coincidentally every time President Bush or the GOP are scoring badly in opinion polls.

Collections
Eight collections of Candorville have been published in book form:
 Candorville: Thank God for Culture Clash (2005) — fearlessly covers bigotry, poverty, homelessness, biracialism, personal responsibility, and more while never losing sight of the humor behind these weighty issues. The strip targets the socially conscious by tackling tough issues with irony, satire, and humor.
 Another Stereotype Bites the Dust: a Candorville Collection (2006)
 Katrina's Ghost: The Third Candorville Collection (2009)
 The Starbucks at the End of the World: The 4th Candorville Collection (2011)
 Run! Vampires, Werewolves, the One That Got Away, and Other Demons: The 5th Candorville Collection (2011) — the story looks on the main character, Lemont, whose new success as The Chronicle'''s senior White House correspondent may be short-lived; as a startling revelation about his evil fiancée motivates him and Dr. Noodle to travel on a journey to Mexico, where they face bloodthirsty demons, vampires, werewolves, and drug cartels. At home, in honor of the first black President, Lemont's friend C-Dog summons the ghost of Richard Pryor for advice on how to stop saying the N-word. He finds himself on the run, impersonating Lemont on his book tour to hide from the insanely huge brother of a girl he's wronged. And as Susan makes a life-altering pact with her backstabbing assistant, Lemont travels back in time to the Nineties to help his younger self seduce her ex-lover.
 Does the Afterlife Have Skittles?: The 6th Candorville Collection (2013)
  Goodnight Grandpa (2015) — Bell's popular character, Lemont, has written a memoir, but when Lemont's wife, Susan, gets to the part where Lemont explains how he and a demon, La Llorona, accidentally caused the end of the world, Susan questions his sanity and debates on saving their relationship. While Lemont's political blog explodes, he faces his challenges at home. Lemont accompanies a 94-year-old World War II veteran on his final journey in the story.
  Color-Blinded'' (2016) — Lemont's a single dad raising a mysteriously smart two-year-old. He's also a journalist single-handedly running one of the top news sites in the country. The comic is based around Lemont trying to figure out how to cover the breaking news in Uganda and Russia, and interview every candidate in the 2016 presidential race. Lamont has to face the process of explaining to his son why he's supposed to respect the police, when the police don't seem to face any repercussions for killing so many unarmed people who look just like his dad. Despite his best efforts, people start to wonder if C-Dog is secretly the smartest, most morally upstanding man in the neighborhood. At the ad agency, Susan discovers why her boss won't ever let her fire her evil, conniving assistant. And Lemont accompanies the recently departed comedian Robin Williams on his final journey.

References

External links
 
Candorville at GoComics.com (updates ended November, 2022)
Candorville at ComicsKingdom.com (beginning December, 2022)
Official author website
Rudy Park website
Candorville book collections

American comic strips
African-Americans in comic strips
Comics about politics
2003 comics debuts
Satirical comics
Vampires in comics